Mark Francis O'Meara (born January 13, 1957) is an American professional golfer.  He was a tournament winner on the PGA Tour and around the world from the mid-1980s to the late 1990s. He spent nearly 200 weeks in the top-10 of the Official World Golf Ranking from their debut in 1986 to 2000. He was inducted into the World Golf Hall of Fame in 2015.

Early years
O'Meara was born in Goldsboro, North Carolina, but grew up in southern California in Mission Viejo. He took up golf at age 13, sneaking on to the nearby Mission Viejo Country Club. O'Meara later became an employee of the club and played on his high school golf team. He was an All-American at Long Beach State, and won the U.S. Amateur in 1979, defeating defending champion John Cook, 8 and 7, in the final. He also won the California State Amateur Championship that year.

O'Meara was a former resident of Orlando, Florida and lived in the same neighborhood as Tiger Woods. The two became good friends and frequently golfed together during this time. O'Meara now resides in Southern Highlands, Nevada.

Professional career
After graduating with a degree in marketing in 1980, O'Meara turned professional and would win 16 events on the PGA Tour, beginning with the Greater Milwaukee Open in 1984. He won the AT&T Pebble Beach National Pro-Am five times, but he passed his 41st birthday in January 1998 without having won a major championship as a professional.

In a late finale to his PGA Tour winning career, O'Meara won two majors in 1998, The Masters and the British Open. O'Meara's victory in The Masters came at his 15th attempt. O'Meara attributed this resurgence partly to the inspiration of working with Tiger Woods, the new superstar of the game at the time, with whom O'Meara had become good friends. In the same year, he won the Cisco World Match Play Championship and reached a career best of second in the Official World Golf Ranking.

O'Meara is known for competing outside the United States more often than most leading American golfers, and has won tournaments in Europe, Asia, Australia and South America. A man with a genial demeanor, he is one of the most popular figures in international golf. In the new millennium his form took a downturn and he began to struggle with injuries, but in 2004 he won an official tour event for the first time since 1998, taking the Dubai Desert Classic title, which despite being played in the Middle East is a European Tour event.

After the European Tour tournament Lancome Trophy at Golf de Saint-Nom-la-Bretèche, 30 km west of Paris, France in September 1997, which was won by O'Meara, he was involved in a controversy. Runner-up was Jarmo Sandelin of Sweden. A television viewer in Sweden observed that, on the 15th green in the final round, O'Meara, facing a two and a half foot putt, had replaced his ball half an inch closer to the hole than had been indicated by his marker. Sandelin wrote to O'Meara in March 1998, sent a video recording of the incident and asked for an explanation. O'Meara insisted he had not intended to gain any advantage and sought advice from the PGA and European Tours, who informed him that the tournament was over and the result stood. Sandelin went public with the story and demanded that O'Meara should hand back the trophy and the prize money. O'Meara admitted in April 1998, he may, without intention, have broken the rules of golf on his way to winning the 1997 Lancome Trophy.

Champions Tour
In 2007, O'Meara began play on the Champions Tour; he had many top-10 finishes in his first three seasons including several runner-up finishes, but no wins. In 2010, he broke through with a win in the Liberty Mutual Legends of Golf with Nick Price, followed by his first senior major victory in the Constellation Energy Senior Players Championship. O'Meara was sidelined by a rib injury for several months starting in April 2012; he missed the majors on both tours and did not compete until August.

O'Meara has begun to develop a golf course design practice and enjoys fishing in his off time. He is currently a brand ambassador for Pacific Links International.

In March 2019, O'Meara won the Cologuard Classic in Tucson, Arizona. He shot a final round seven-under 66, to win by four shots. This win ended an eight-year win drought on the PGA Tour Champions.

Amateur wins
1979 U.S. Amateur, California State Amateur Championship

Professional wins (34)

PGA Tour wins (16)

PGA Tour playoff record (3–4)

European Tour wins (5)

European Tour playoff record (1–0)

Japan Golf Tour wins (2)

PGA Tour of Australasia wins (1)

South American Tour wins (1)
1994 Argentine Open

Other wins (8)

Other playoff record (3–0)

PGA Tour Champions wins (3)

PGA Tour Champions playoff record (2–2)

Major championships

Wins (2)

1Defeated Brian Watts in 4-hole playoff: O'Meara (4-4-5-4=17), Watts (5-4-5-5=19)

Results timeline

CUT = missed the halfway cut
"T" indicates a tie for a place.

Summary

Most consecutive cuts made – 11 (1995 Masters – 1999 Masters)
Longest streak of top-10s – 2 (1998 Open Championship – 1998 PGA)

Results in The Players Championship

CUT = missed the halfway cut
WD = withdrew
"T" indicates a tie for a place

Results in World Golf Championships

1Cancelled due to 9/11

QF, R16, R32, R64 = Round in which player lost in match play
"T" = Tied
WD = Withdrew
NT = No tournament

Senior major championships

Wins (1)

Results timeline
Results not in chronological order before 2022.

CUT = missed the halfway cut
WD = withdrew
"T" indicates a tie for a place
NT = No tournament due to COVID-19 pandemic

U.S. national team appearances
Professional
Alfred Dunhill Cup: 1985, 1986, 1987, 1996 (winners), 1997, 1998, 1999
Ryder Cup: 1985, 1989 (tie), 1991 (winners), 1997, 1999 (winners)
Nissan Cup: 1985 (winners)
Presidents Cup: 1996 (winners), 1998
World Cup: 1999 (winners)
UBS Cup: 2001 (winners), 2002 (winners), 2003 (tie)

See also
Fall 1980 PGA Tour Qualifying School graduates
List of golfers with most wins in one PGA Tour event

References

External links

The official Mark O'Meara Design web site

American male golfers
PGA Tour golfers
PGA Tour Champions golfers
Ryder Cup competitors for the United States
Winners of men's major golf championships
Winners of senior major golf championships
World Golf Hall of Fame inductees
Golfers from North Carolina
Golfers from California
Golfers from Texas
BBC Sports Personality World Sport Star of the Year winners
California State University, Long Beach alumni
Mission Viejo High School alumni
People from Goldsboro, North Carolina
1957 births
Living people